Chiranjeevi is a 1984 Indian Tamil-language film, directed by K. Shankar and produced by S. Jagadeesan. The film stars Sivaji Ganesan, Sripriya, Jai Ganesh and Sarath Babu.

Plot 
On a cruise ride, Chiranjeevi is a singer cum technician on the ship. A murder related to smuggling happens in the ship and it is up to him to find out who did it while protecting the only witness played by Sarathbabu's wife played out in Agatha Christie style.

Cast 
Sivaji Ganesan
Sripriya
Jai Ganesh
Sarath Babu
Sathyaraj
Vijayakumar
V. Gopala Krishnan
Thengai Srinivasan
Sowkar Janaki
Manorama

Soundtrack 
The music was composed by M. S. Viswanathan.

References

External links 
 

1984 films
Films scored by M. S. Viswanathan
1980s Tamil-language films
Films directed by K. Shankar